Ganesha (2,5-dimethoxy-3,4-dimethylamphetamine) is a lesser-known psychedelic drug. It is also a substituted amphetamine. It was first synthesized by Alexander Shulgin. In his book PiHKAL, the dosage range is listed as 24–32 mg. The drug is usually taken orally, although other routes such as rectally may also be used. Ganesha is synthesized from 2,5-dimethoxy-3,4-dimethylbenzaldehyde. Ganesha is the amphetamine analog of 2C-G. It is a particularly long lasting drug, with the duration listed in PiHKAL as being 18–24 hours, which might make it undesirable to some users. It is named after the Hindu deity, Ganesha. Very little is known about the dangers or toxicity of ganesha.  Effects of ganesha include:

 Strong closed-eye visuals
 An increased appreciation of music
 Powerful relaxation and tranquility

Homologues

G-3

2,5-Dimethoxy-3,4-(trimethylene)amphetamine:

 Dosage: 12–18 mg
 Duration: 8-12 h
 Effects: Enhancement of reading, no visuals or body load.
 2C analog: 2C-G-3

G-4

2,5-Dimethoxy-3,4-(tetramethylene)amphetamine:

 Dosage: unknown
 Duration: unknown
 Effects: unknown
 2C analog: 2C-G-4

G-5
3,6-Dimethoxy-4-(2-aminopropyl)benzonorbornane:

 Dosage: 14–20 mg
 Duration: 16-30 h
 2C analog: 2C-G-5

G-N

1,4-Dimethoxynaphthyl-2-isopropylamine:

 2C analog: 2C-G-N

Legality

United Kingdom
This substance is a Class A drug in the Drugs controlled by the UK Misuse of Drugs Act.

See also 
 Phenethylamine
 Psychedelics, dissociatives and deliriants
 Beatrice (psychedelic)
 DODC

References

Substituted amphetamines
Phenol ethers